"April in Paris" is a popular song composed by Vernon Duke with lyrics by Yip Harburg in 1932 for the Broadway musical Walk a Little Faster. The original 1933 hit was performed by Freddy Martin, and the 1952 remake (inspired by the movie of the same name) was by the Sauter-Finegan Orchestra, whose version made the Cashbox Top 50. Composer Alec Wilder writes, "There are no two ways about it: this is a perfect theater song. If that sounds too reverent, then I'll reduce the praise to 'perfectly wonderful,' or else say that if it's not perfect, show me why it isn't."

Recordings

Count Basie version
Count Basie's 1955 recording on the album of the same name is the most famous, and that particular performance was inducted into the Grammy Hall of Fame.  The arrangement was by Wild Bill Davis. On this recording, trumpeter Thad Jones played his famous "Pop Goes the Weasel" solo, trombonist Benny Powell performed his much noted bridge, and Basie directs the band to play the shout chorus "one more time" and then "one more once."

A revised arrangement of the song, played by the Count Basie Orchestra in a cameo appearance, is also featured in the 1974 film Blazing Saddles. Basie's recording is also featured in the video game Grand Theft Auto IV, on the fictional jazz radio station JNR 108.5.

Other versions
Freddy Martin and Henry King had the earliest hits of this song, at the very end of 1933.

It has been performed by many artists, including Louis Armstrong, Count Basie, Billy Eckstine, Bill Evans, Charlie Parker, Coleman Hawkins, Frank Sinatra, Mary Kaye Trio, Billie Holiday, Thelonious Monk, Bud Powell, Erroll Garner, Ella Fitzgerald, Sarah Vaughan, Benny Goodman, Dinah Shore, Glenn Miller, Tommy Dorsey, Joni James, Blossom Dearie, Tony Bennett, Doris Day, Alex Chilton, Wynton Marsalis, Andy Williams, Michel Legrand, Ahmad Jamal and Dawn Upshaw.

 Carl Stalling and Milt Franklyn arranged the song for the 1951 Pepé Le Pew cartoon, "Scent-imental Romeo" (1951).
 Shirley Bassey recorded the song for her 1959 album The Fabulous Shirley Bassey.
 Sammy Davis Jr. recorded the song for his album When the Feeling Hits You! (1965)
 Ray Stevens recorded the song for his album Nouveau Retro (2021)

See also
List of 1930s jazz standards
April in Paris (film)

Literature 
 Ted Gioia The Jazz Standards: A Guide to the Repertoire Oxford University Press; Oxford 2012;

References

External links
 "April in Paris" at JazzStandards.com

1932 songs
1930s jazz standards
Songs with music by Vernon Duke
Songs with lyrics by Yip Harburg
Grammy Hall of Fame Award recipients
Songs about Paris
Jazz compositions in C major
Songs from musicals